Nazim Azman (born 17 August 2001) is a Malaysian racing driver who most recently competed in the FIA Formula 3 Championship with Hitech Grand Prix. He is a race winner in BRDC Formula 3 and the Euroformula Open Championship.

Career

Karting career 
Azman began karting competitively in 2012. That year he won the Rotax Max Challenge Malaysia in the MicroMax category and would finish third in the Rotax Max Challenge Asia. He moved into European competitions in 2013, achieving a third-place finish in the ROK Cup International Final in Italy, beating the likes of future Indy Lights driver Antonio Serravalle. Azman raced in karts until 2015.

Formula 4

2016 
Azman began single-seaters in 2016, competing in two rounds during the 2016-17 Formula 4 South East Asia Championship as a guest driver.

2017 
For his main 2017 campaign, he competed in the F4 Spanish Championship with MP Motorsport from round 2 onwards. He took a high finish of fifth place twice and ended 11th in the standings. He also raced with MP during the final round of the SMP F4 Championship. His other one-off 2017 campaigns included the Formula Masters China and the Blancpain GT Series Asia.

During late September, Azman participated in the 2017-18 MRF Challenge Formula 2000 Championship, and ended 13th. He also participated in three rounds during the 2017-18 Formula 4 South East Asia Championship, taking his first two single-seater wins on his way to fourth in the overall standings.

2018 
For 2018, Jenzer Motorsport signed Azman to compete in the 2018 Italian F4 Championship. He scored six points finishes, achieving a high of seventh for 17th in the overall classification. He also had another full-time campaign in the F4 Spanish Championship, driving for Drivex School. After scoring two third places during the opening round, he switched to MP Motorsport, and two more podiums saw him took the championship lead following the conclusion of the second weekend. Azman scored four more podiums for the rest of the year and wounded up fourth in the standings.

BRDC British Formula 3 
In 2019 Azman moved to the BRDC British F3 championship with Chris Dittmann Racing. He had a slow first half of the season, but took his first win during the third round at Brands Hatch. Azman took another win during the final round, placing 11th overall.

2020 
Azman remained in BRDC Formula 3 in 2020 but switched to Carlin alongside American racing driver Kaylen Frederick and Brazilian Guilherme Peixoto. He began the season with two wins in three races, before taking his first win during the third round at Brands Hatch. Towards the end of the season, Azman scored another win. Other than his two wins, Azman scored six more podiums and ended the standings in fifth position overall.

Euroformula Open Championship 

In 2021 Azman moved into the Euroformula Open Championship, partnering former British F3 rival Louis Foster and Filip Kaminiarz at CryptoTower Racing. He started his season in positive fashion, scoring his first podium in the series with a second-placed finish in the second race at the Algarve International Circuit. At the third round at Spa-Francorchamps Azman would have his best weekend of the season, finishing on the rostrum in all three races of the event, and the Malaysian followed that up by scoring another pair of podiums in the following round. Two rounds later at the Hungaroring, Azman would claim his only win and last podium of the series. He continued to take good points and eventually ended fourth in the standings.

FIA Formula 3 Championship 
Azman partook in the post-season test of the FIA Formula 3 Championship in Valencia, driving for Swiss outfit Jenzer Motorsport and Charouz Racing System. Just before the pre-season test in Bahrain, Azman announced that he would join Hitech Grand Prix for the 2022 campaign, partnering with Red Bull Junior Team member Isack Hadjar and 2020 British Formula 3 champion Kaylen Frederick. In doing so, Azman became the first Malaysian driver to participate in the FIA Formula 3 Championship. Azman would be outpaced by Hadjar and Frederick throughout the season, and even had tough moments such as being in a collision with Rafael Villagómez in Silverstone. Azman ended the season with 0 points in 32nd, having had a best finish of 16th thrice.

Personal life 
Azman grew up in Kuala Lumpur, Malaysia, but during his racing career he has been living in London.

Karting record

Karting career summary 

 * Azman entered for selected races only

Racing record

Racing career summary 

† As Azman was a guest driver, he was ineligible to score points notwithstanding finishing first in the GT4 category.
* Azman entered for one round only.
**Azman entered for 3 rounds out of 5.

Complete Formula 4 South East Asia Championship results 
(key) (Races in bold indicate pole position) (Races in italics indicate fastest lap)

† As Azman was a guest driver, he was ineligible to score points.

Complete Formula Masters China results 
(key) (Races in bold indicate pole position) (Races in italics indicate fastest lap)

Complete Blancpain GT Series Asia results 
(key) (Races in bold indicate pole position) (Races in italics indicate fastest lap)

† As Azman was a guest driver, he was ineligible to score points.

Complete SMP F4 Championship results 
(key) (Races in bold indicate pole position) (Races in italics indicate fastest lap)

Complete F4 Spanish Championship results 
(key) (Races in bold indicate pole position) (Races in italics indicate fastest lap)

Complete MRF Challenge Formula 2000 Championship results 
(key) (Races in bold indicate pole position; races in italics indicate fastest lap)

Complete Italian F4 Championship results 
(key) (Races in bold indicate pole position) (Races in italics indicate fastest lap)

Complete BRDC British Formula 3 Championship results 
(key) (Races in bold indicate pole position) (Races in italics indicate fastest lap)

Complete Euroformula Open Championship results 
(key) (Races in bold indicate pole position; races in italics indicate points for the fastest lap of top ten finishers)

Complete FIA Formula 3 Championship results 
(key) (Races in bold indicate pole position; races in italics indicate points for the fastest lap of top ten finishers)

References

External links 
 

Living people
2001 births
Malaysian racing drivers
Euroformula Open Championship drivers
Carlin racing drivers
MP Motorsport drivers
BRDC British Formula 3 Championship drivers
SMP F4 Championship drivers
Spanish F4 Championship drivers
Formula Masters China drivers
MRF Challenge Formula 2000 Championship drivers
Italian F4 Championship drivers
FIA Formula 3 Championship drivers
Jenzer Motorsport drivers
Drivex drivers
Motopark Academy drivers
Hitech Grand Prix drivers
Team Meritus drivers
Eurasia Motorsport drivers
Chris Dittmann Racing drivers
21st-century Malaysian people